Richard Fire (November 12, 1945 – July 8, 2015) was an American theater actor and writer based in Chicago. He was also an Emmy Award winner.

Biography
Fire was born in Paterson, New Jersey. He originally started at a  theater department at the University of Wisconsin-Madison. Stuart Gordon later joined him to the cast of Chicago's Organic Theater Company.

Theater credits
Warp! (1971)
Bleacher Bums (1977)
E/R Emergency Room (1982)
Dr. Rat (1982)

Filmography
Poltergeist III (1988)

References

1945 births
2015 deaths
Actors from New Jersey
American actors
People from Paterson, New Jersey